Tatsumi Kasahara (born 21 January 1977) is a Japanese biathlete. He competed in the men's 20 km individual event at the 2006 Winter Olympics.

References

1977 births
Living people
Japanese male biathletes
Olympic biathletes of Japan
Biathletes at the 2006 Winter Olympics
Sportspeople from Niigata Prefecture
Asian Games medalists in biathlon
Biathletes at the 2003 Asian Winter Games
Biathletes at the 2007 Asian Winter Games
Asian Games gold medalists for Japan
Asian Games silver medalists for Japan
Asian Games bronze medalists for Japan
Medalists at the 2003 Asian Winter Games
Medalists at the 2007 Asian Winter Games
21st-century Japanese people